Colter Peak el.  is a mountain peak in the Absaroka Range in the southeastern section of Yellowstone National Park.  The peak is named for mountain man John Colter, reputedly the first white man to visit the Yellowstone region.  Colter Peak was first ascended in 1870 by Lt. Gustavus Cheyney Doane and Nathaniel P. Langford during the Washburn–Langford–Doane Expedition.  Henry D. Washburn, the expedition leader named the peak for Langford and Doane.  For unknown reasons, geologist Ferdinand V. Hayden moved those names to peaks farther north in 1871 during the Hayden Geological Survey of 1871.  In 1888, Philetus Norris the second park superintendent, named the peak Mount Forum for unknown reasons.  In 1885, geologist Arnold Hague gave the peak its official name: Colter Peak.

The first detailed map of Yellowstone Lake was sketched by Langford from this peak on September 7, 1870.

Doane's account of his and Langford's ascent into the Absaroka Range (The peak ascended is today's Colter Peak):

See also
 Mountains and mountain ranges of Yellowstone National Park

Notes

Mountains of Wyoming
Mountains of Yellowstone National Park
Mountains of Park County, Wyoming